The Congo national football team (French:  Équipe de football du Congo) represents the Republic of the Congo in men's association football and is governed by the Congolese Football Federation. They have never qualified for the World Cup, but did win the Africa Cup of Nations in 1972. They also won the All-Africa Games football tournament in 1965. The team is also a member of both FIFA and the Confederation of African Football (CAF).

History
The Congo national football team made its first ever appearance in February 1960 in a friendly against the Ivory Coast which they lost 4–2. On 13 April, they defeated Reunion 4–1 in their first game to advance to the quarter-finals. In their quarter-final on 15 April, they defeated the Ivory Coast 3–2. On 17 April, they lost 5–4 to Cameroon and were beaten 8–1 by the host Madagascar in the third-place play-off on 19 April.

In April 1963 they entered another L'Amitié competition, this time in Senegal, and were drawn in a group with Tunisia, the Ivory Coast, Democratic Republic of Congo and Mauritania. They lost their opener 2–0 to Tunisia on 13 April but beat the Ivory Coast 3–2 the next day. On 15 April they beat their neighbour Congo Kinshasa 2–1, and then Mauritania 11–0 two days later, but did not advance to the next round.

In July 1965 the Congo held the 1965 All-Africa Games and were drawn in a group with Mali, Uganda and Togo. They drew 1–1 with Mali on 18 July and beat Uganda 2–1 the next day. On 21 July they drew 1–1 against Togo but advanced through to the semi-finals, where they beat the Ivory Coast 1–0 on 23 July. On 25 July the Congo drew 0–0 versus Mali in the final, but won the tournament by having won ten corners in the final compared to Mali's one.

On 11 January 1967 the Congo played their first non-African opposition, defeating Romania 1–0 in a home friendly. On 19 February 1967 the Congo travelled to Tunisia for their first ever African Cup of Nations qualifier, drawing 1–1. On 2 August 1967 they hosted a qualifier against Cameroon, and defeated them 2–1 to top their qualifying group and advance to their first finals.

The finals were held in Ethiopia in January 1968 and the Congo were drawn in a group with their neighbour Zaire, Senegal and Ghana. They lost the opener to Zaire 3–0 on 12 January and two days later lost 2–1 to Senegal. On 16 January the Congo were defeated 3–1 by Ghana and were knocked out.

The Congo hosted a friendly against Romania for the second successive year on 16 June 1968 and won 4–2. On 30 July 1968 they played their first ever South American opposition, losing a home friendly 2–0 to Brazil.

In 1972, the Congo won their only African Cup of Nations title. Congo defeated host Cameroon in the semi-final 1–0 before beating Mali 3–2 to claim the championship. On that squad was arguably Congo's most famous player, François M'Pelé, who starred for PSG in the 1970s.

In qualification for the 1998 World Cup, the Congo came within a win of qualifying for the final tournament. However, after home wins over Zambia, DR Congo and South Africa, Congo lost their final match 1–0 away to South Africa and was eliminated.

Results and fixtures

2022

2023

Coaches

Players

Current squad
The following players were called-up for the 2023 Africa Cup of Nations qualification matches against Madagascar on 20 and 28 March 2023.

Caps and goals are correct as of 24 September 2022, after the match against Mauritania.

Recent call-ups
The following players were called up for Congo in the last 12 months.

DEC Player refused to join the team after the call-up.
INJ Player withdrew from the squad due to an injury.
PRE Preliminary squad.
RET Player has retired from international football.
SUS Suspended from the national team.

Records

Players in bold are still active with Congo.

Competition records

FIFA World Cup record

Africa Cup of Nations record

African Games

Achievements
CEMAC Cup:
1 Time Champions (2007)
UDEAC Championship:
1 Time Champions (1990)
2 Times Runners-up
Central African Games:
2 Times Runners-up

References

External links

 

 
African national association football teams
C